Kyle Warren (born 1 February 1973) is an Australian former professional rugby league footballer who played in the 1990s and 2000s. He played for the North Queensland Cowboys in the National Rugby League and for the Castleford Tigers (Heritage № 787) in the Super League.

Background
Born in Mackay, Queensland, Warren played for Brothers (formally called All Whites) in Toowoomba before being signed by the Manly Sea Eagles.

Playing career
In 1993 and 1994, Warren played for the Sea Eagles but did not feature in first grade for the club. In 1995, he returned to Queensland, joining the Toowoomba Clydesdales. In 1996, he represented the Queensland Residents and started at fullback in the Clydesdales' 8–6 1996 Queensland Cup Grand Final win over the Redcliffe Dolphins.

In 1997, Warren joined the North Queensland Cowboys, making his first grade debut in the side's 24–16 win over the Adelaide Rams at Stockland Stadium. Warren became a regular in the Cowboys' side during his five seasons at the club, playing 87 games and scoring 26 tries.

In 2002, Warren moved to the Castleford Tigers in the English Super League. In his lone season with the club he played 30 games, scoring three tries. He was released at the end of the season.

Warren returned to Australia in 2003, playing two seasons for the Ipswich Jets in the Queensland Cup. In 2005, Warren played his final season of rugby league for Brothers in Toowoomba, retiring at the end of the season.

Statistics

NRL
 Statistics are correct to the end of the 2001 season

Super League/Challenge Cup
 Statistics are correct to the end of the 2002 season

Post-playing career
In 2006, Warren became the CEO of the Toowoomba Clydesdales for their final season in the Queensland Cup.

References

1973 births
Living people
Australian rugby league players
Castleford Tigers players
Ipswich Jets players
North Queensland Cowboys players
Rugby league locks
Rugby league players from Mackay, Queensland
Rugby league second-rows
Toowoomba Clydesdales players